New York State Route 53 (NY 53) is a north–south state highway located in the Finger Lakes region of New York in the United States. Just north of Kanona, located within the town of Bath, NY 53 connects to the Southern Tier Expressway (Interstate 86 or I-86 and NY 17). About midway between Kanona and Naples, the route serves the hamlet of Prattsburgh.

When NY 53 was assigned as part of the 1930 renumbering of state highways in New York, it extended from Kanona in the south to the Canandaigua area in the north, utilizing what is now NY 247 north of Potter. At the same time, the piece of what is now NY 53 from Prattsburgh to Naples became NY 247. NY 53 was realigned onto its modern alignment from Prattsburgh to Naples in the early 1940s. NY 247, supplanted by the realignment, was reassigned to NY 53's former routing north of Potter.

Route description

NY 53 begins at an intersection with NY 415, the former routing of U.S. Route 15 (US 15) through the Southern Tier, southeast of Kanona, a hamlet within the Steuben County town of Bath. It initially heads northwest on Main Street, following the Cohocton River into the center of Kanona. At this point, NY 53 leaves Main Street to follow an unnamed road north through the residential northern half of the community to an interchange with the Southern Tier Expressway (I-86 and NY 17) at exit 37. North of I-86, NY 53 follows Fivemile Creek northeastward into a valley that leads to the rural town of Wheeler.

Over the next , the route traverses a series of small hamlets located in otherwise undeveloped and isolated areas of Steuben County. The gully leads NY 53 to the Wheeler–Prattsburgh town line, where the valley makes a sharp turn to follow the town line to the east. NY 53 continues due north into Prattsburgh, however, climbing the side of the valley to reach the hamlet of Prattsburgh. The route heads north–south through the western edge of the large community, following Main Street through its central business district. At Chapel Street, the commercial surroundings end and NY 53 turns to leave Prattsburgh to the northwest.

Roughly  outside of Prattsburgh, NY 53 turns to the west, loosely paralleling the Steuben–Ontario county line as it winds its way across the hilly, forested northernmost portion of Steuben County. The route breaks from this alignment after , at which point it turns to the north and crosses into Ontario County. At the north end of this stretch, NY 53 enters a residential area at the southern edge of the village of Naples, where it ends at a junction with NY 21.

History
NY 53 was assigned as part of the 1930 renumbering of state highways in New York to its current alignment from Kanona north to Prattsburgh. Past Prattsburgh, NY 53 continued north on State Road, McMichael Road, Wetmore Road, Italy Hill Road, Italy Friend Road, Friend Road, and modern NY 247 before terminating at a junction with US 20 and NY 5 east of Canandaigua. What is now NY 53 from Prattsburgh to Naples was designated NY 247. In the early 1940s, NY 53 was realigned north of Prattsburgh to follow NY 247 to Naples while NY 247 was reassigned to the portion of NY 53's former routing north of NY 364 in Potter. The segment of NY 53's former routing between Prattsburgh and McMichael Road north of the hamlet remained state-maintained as a reference route until April 1, 1980, when ownership and maintenance of the road was transferred from the state to Steuben County as part of a highway maintenance swap between the two levels of government.

Major intersections

See also

References

External links

053
Transportation in Ontario County, New York
Transportation in Steuben County, New York